2637 Bobrovnikoff, provisional designation , is a background asteroid from the inner regions of the asteroid belt, approximately  in diameter. It was discovered on 22 September 1919, by German astronomer Karl Reinmuth at the Heidelberg-Königstuhl State Observatory in Heidelberg, Germany. The presumed spherical S-type asteroid has a rotation period of 4.79 hours. It is named after astronomer Nicholas Bobrovnikoff, who was the director of the Perkins Observatory in Ohio, United States.

Orbit and classification 

Bobrovnikoff is a non-family asteroid from the main belt's background population. It orbits the Sun in the inner asteroid belt at a distance of 1.7–2.8 AU once every 3 years and 5 months (1,237 days; semi-major axis of 2.26 AU). Its orbit has an eccentricity of 0.23 and an inclination of 5° with respect to the ecliptic. The body's observation arc begins at Heidelberg in 1919, three days after its official discovery observation.

Physical characteristics 

Bobrovnikoff is an assumed, stony S-type asteroid.

Rotation period 

In September 2007, a rotational lightcurve of Bobrovnikoff was obtained from photometric observations by French and Swiss astronomers Pierre Antonini, Raoul Behrend, and Alain Klotz. Lightcurve analysis gave a well-defined rotation period of 4.7939 hours with a brightness amplitude of 0.13 magnitude, indicative of a rather spherical shape.

Diameter and albedo 

According to the survey carried out by the NEOWISE mission of NASA's Wide-field Infrared Survey Explorer, Bobrovnikoff measures between 5.82 and 6.919 kilometers in diameter and its surface has an albedo between 0.2563 and 0.37.

The Collaborative Asteroid Lightcurve Link assumes a standard albedo for stony asteroids of 0.20 and calculates a larger diameter of 7.46 kilometers based on an absolute magnitude of 13.0.

Naming 

This minor planet was named after Russian-born cometary spectroscopist Nicholas Theodore Bobrovnikoff (1896–1988), known for his research on the 1910-apparition of Halley's Comet. From 1934 to 1951, he was the director of the Perkins Observatory in Delaware, Ohio. The naming was proposed by the director of Minor Planet Center, Brian G. Marsden, and the official citation was published on 24 July 1983.

References

External links 
 Bobrovnikoff, Nicholas Theodore, Biographical Encyclopedia of Astronomers, Spring 2014
 Asteroid Lightcurve Database (LCDB), query form (info )
 Dictionary of Minor Planet Names, Google books
 Asteroids and comets rotation curves, CdR – Observatoire de Genève, Raoul Behrend
 Discovery Circumstances: Numbered Minor Planets (1)-(5000) – Minor Planet Center
 
 

002637
Discoveries by Karl Wilhelm Reinmuth
Named minor planets
19190922